The Church of Humanity was a positivist church founded in England in 1878 by Richard Congrve and others.

Church of Humanity may also refer to:
 Religion of Humanity, secular religion proposed c.1849 by Auguste Comte
 Church of Humanity (comics), anti-mutant cult in the Marvel universe
 Church of Humanity Unchained, religions of the Grayson and Masada systems in the Honorverse military science fiction series

See also
 Humanism (disambiguation)
 Fellowship of Humanity, humanist church in Oakland, California